Patrick Oaten is a Canadian water polo coach. He was the head coach of the Brazil women's national water polo team at the 2016 Summer Olympics.

References

External links
 

Year of birth missing (living people)
Living people
Canadian male water polo players
Canadian water polo coaches
Brazil women's national water polo team coaches
Water polo coaches at the 2016 Summer Olympics